Holly Twyford is a Washington, D.C.-based American stage actress and director. She is a ten-time nominee and a four-time winner of the Helen Hayes Award.

Early life and career
Twyford grew up in Great Falls, Virginia. She attended the School of Theatre Arts at  Boston University's School of Theatre Arts before returning to the D.C. area to pursue acting. Before her theatre career was established, she worked as a bartender and in the costume department of the renowned Arena Stage, where she would later star.

Twyford has appeared in over thirty productions for organizations including Arena Stage, the Folger Shakespeare Library, Shakespeare Theatre Company, Studio Theatre, Source Theatre, Woolly Mammoth Theatre Company, Theatre J, Olney Theatre, Round House Theatre and the now-defunct Consenting Adults Theater Company, where she earned her first Helen Hayes Award nomination in 1993. She commonly collaborates with director Joe Banno on offbeat productions of Shakespeare plays, including a 1999 version of Hamlet at the Folger in which Twyford, along with three others, portrayed the protagonist as a fractured personality.

Twyford's film and television appearances include Out of Season, Pecker, Falling to Peaces and a 1997 episode of Homicide: Life on the Street.

Twyford is a lesbian and has been out for her entire career. She had been with her partner, an environmentalist, since 1992.

In a 2005 group interview with director Delia Taylor and playwright Jeanette Buck for Metro Weekly, she said that she didn't feel her homosexuality had hindered her career, but that the necessity of coming out to coworkers when starting a new job "gets to be real tiring". In the same interview, she and her colleagues also discussed the paucity of female roles and the need for more female directors, playwrights and producers in both the theatre industry and Hollywood.

Helen Hayes Awards

References

Horwitz, Jane. "Backstage." The Washington Post 25 May 1999, sec. Style: c05.
Shulman, Randy. "Stage Presence: Theatrical Bonds." Metro Weekly 7 Apr. 2005. 9 July 2007.
Tischler, Gary. "Performance." The GeorgeTowner. 26 Jan. 2003. 9 July 2007.

American film actresses
American stage actresses
Boston University College of Fine Arts alumni
Living people
Madeira School alumni
People from Great Falls, Virginia
Actresses from Washington, D.C.
Year of birth missing (living people)
Actresses from Virginia
American lesbian actresses
LGBT people from Washington, D.C.
LGBT people from Virginia
American theatre directors
Women theatre directors
LGBT theatre directors
20th-century American actresses
21st-century American actresses